2 Chronicles 13 is the thirteenth chapter of the Second Book of Chronicles the Old Testament in the Christian Bible or of the second part of the Books of Chronicles in the Hebrew Bible. The book is compiled from older sources by an unknown person or group, designated by modern scholars as "the Chronicler", and had the final shape established in late fifth or fourth century BCE. This chapter belongs to the section focusing on the kingdom of Judah until its destruction by the Babylonians under Nebuchadnezzar and the beginning of restoration under Cyrus the Great of Persia  (2 Chronicles 10 to 36). The focus of this chapter is the reign of Abijah, king of Judah.

Text
This chapter was originally written in the Hebrew language and is divided into 22 verses in Christian Bibles, but 23 verses in the Hebrew Bible with the following verse numbering comparison:

This article generally follows the common numbering in Christian English Bible versions, with notes to the numbering in Hebrew Bible versions.

Textual witnesses
Some early manuscripts containing the text of this chapter in Hebrew are of the Masoretic Text tradition, which includes the Aleppo Codex (10th century), and Codex Leningradensis (1008).

There is also a translation into Koine Greek known as the Septuagint, made in the last few centuries BCE. Extant ancient manuscripts of the Septuagint version include Codex Vaticanus (B; B; 4th century), and Codex Alexandrinus (A; A; 5th century).

Old Testament references
:

Abijah king of Judah (13:1–2)
The information about Abijah's reign over Judah contains no judgement (unlike the negative judgement in 1 Kings), which is otherwise only given to Jehoahaz (2 Chronicles 36:1–4), and a report of his (one and only) victory over Jeroboam (not recorded in 1 Kings), preceded by a sermon on the mount which portrays the basic relationship between the northern and southern kingdoms.

Verse 1
In the eighteenth year of King Jeroboam, Abijah became king over Judah.
 Parallel: 1 Kings 15:1
"In the eighteenth year of King Jeroboam": in Thiele's chronology, Abijah became king between April and September 913 BCE, at an unknown age. This is the only recorded synchronism with the northern kingdom in the Chronicles.
 Abijah: spelled as "Abijam" in 1 Kings 15:1 (following Masoretic Text; LXX has  corresponding to "Abijahu").

Verse 2
He reigned three years in Jerusalem. His mother’s name was Michaiah the daughter of Uriel of Gibeah.
And there was war between Abijah and Jeroboam.
 Parallel: 1 Kings 15:2
 "He reigned three years": In Thiele's chronology, Abijah started to reign between April and September 913 BCE, then died between September 911 and April 910 BCE, at an unknown age.
 "Michaiah": spelled following Masoretic Text. In Greek Septuagint, Syriac dan Arabic versions, it is spelled as "Maachah" as in 1 Kings 15:2  (cf. ).  states that Abijah was born of "Maachah the daughter of Absalom". The word "daughter" in Hebrew may also stand for "granddaughter". Josephus notes that Maachah was the daughter of Tamar, the only daughter of Absalom, so "Uriel of Gibeah" must have been the husband of Tamar.

War between Abijah and Jeroboam (13:3–22)
This section consists of preparations for war, a lengthy speech, and the description of an actual battle between the army of Abijah (kingdom of Judah) and that of Jeroboam (northern kingdom of Israel). Abijah's army (400,000 'valiant warriors ... picked men') was only half the size of Jeroboam's (800,000 'picked mighty warriors'—a number corresponding to 2 Samuel 24:9 and David's census), suggesting that on human terms, northern Israel should be victorious. Still, Abijah made a 'stylistically and rhetorically artistic speech' (verses 5–12), calling on the people of the northern kingdom to return to the legitimate rule of the David's line (YHWH's elect), the legitimate office of priesthood in Jerusalem, and the legitimate (and pure) worship in the temple of Jerusalem, from the idolatrous worship of Jeroboam with his own priests serving that of 'no gods' (lo elohim; cf. Hosea 8:6). The 'enumeration of Judean orthopraxis' by Abijah describes the Temple worship during the period of United Monarchy (1 Chronicles 15–16; 23–29; 2 Chronicles 2–4) with reference to the tabernacle worship at the time of Moses (Exodus 25:30-40; 29:1-9, 38-42; 30:7-10; Leviticus 24:3-9; Numbers 8:2-4; 28:3-8). The battle had the elements of tactics by the Israelites, who prepared an ambush, and the holy warfare by the Judeans, for whom the Lord acted to strike down Jeroboam's troops, enabling the Judeans to kill 500,000 chosen men of Israel (verses 16–17).

Verse 4
Then Abijah stood on Mount Zemaraim, which is in the mountains of Ephraim, and said, “Hear me, Jeroboam and all Israel:
"Mount Zemaraim": not mentioned elsewhere, presumably a mountain or hill near the borders of Benjamin and Ephraim, above the place called Zemaraim (Joshua 18:22) in Benjamin's territory, mentioned between the places called Beth ha-Arabah (in the Jordan valley) and Bethel. The mountains of Ephraim runs from the Plain of Esdraelon, through the midst of the area later called Samaria, to the territory of Judah.

Verse 22
And the rest of the acts of Abijah, and his ways, and his sayings, are written in the story of the prophet Iddo.
"Story": from Hebrew: midrash, a term that is repeated only once in the Hebrew Bible (2 Chronicles 24:27; cf. Sirach 51:23), can also be translated as "exposition, study, commentary". 2 Chronicles 9:29 and 12:15 also refer to the prophet Iddo.

See also

Related Bible parts: Exodus 25; Exodus 29; Exodus 30; Leviticus 24; Numbers 8; 1 Kings 1, 1 Kings 10, 1 Kings 11, 1 Kings 12, 1 Kings 14, 1 Chronicles 6, 1 Chronicles 18, 1 Chronicles 22, 1 Chronicles 29

Notes

References

Sources

External links
 Jewish translations:
 Divrei Hayamim II - II Chronicles - Chapter 13 (Judaica Press) in Hebrew and English translation [with Rashi's commentary] at Chabad.org
 Christian translations:
 Online Bible at GospelHall.org (ESV, KJV, Darby, American Standard Version, Bible in Basic English)
 2 Chronicles Chapter 13. Bible Gateway

13